Boufakrane is a town and municipality in Meknès Prefecture of the Fès-Meknès region of Morocco. At the time of the 2004 census, the commune had a total population of 6326 people living in 1376 households.

References

Populated places in Meknès Prefecture
Municipalities of Morocco